Illinois Route 16 (IL 16) is an east–west highway in central Illinois. Its western terminus is at the Joe Page Bridge  over the Illinois River in Hardin, while its eastern terminus is at Paris at Illinois Route 1 and U.S. Route 150, with Illinois Route 133.

Route description

Illinois 16 is a major east–west state highway in Central Illinois. It runs east from Hardin to Hillsboro, and then turns northeast to Pana. Illinois 16 then continues east to Shelbyville and then to Paris. It overlaps Illinois 133 shortly before entering Paris.

In Paris, Illinois 16 and Illinois 133 terminate at the intersection of Jasper and Main/Central Streets. Illinois 16/133 run west from this intersection, while U.S. 150 runs north and east. Illinois 1 runs north and south.

History
SBI Route 16 was established in 1918, running originally from Litchfield east to Paris. In 1962, a new 4-lane highway was built from Mattoon to Charleston; this became Illinois 16, while the old alignment became Illinois Route 316, which was dropped sometime in the 1970s.

Major intersections

See also

 List of state routes in Illinois

References

External links

 Illinois Highway Ends: Illinois Route 16

016
Transportation in Calhoun County, Illinois
Transportation in Greene County, Illinois
Transportation in Jersey County, Illinois
Transportation in Macoupin County, Illinois
Transportation in Montgomery County, Illinois
Transportation in Christian County, Illinois
Transportation in Shelby County, Illinois
Transportation in Moultrie County, Illinois
Transportation in Coles County, Illinois
Transportation in Edgar County, Illinois